Events in the year 2016 in Trinidad and Tobago.

Incumbents
 President: Anthony Carmona
 Prime Minister: Keith Rowley
 Chief Justice: Ivor Archie

Events
 2016 Trinidadian local elections

Deaths
7 January – Jit Samaroo, 65, steelpan musician and arranger.
17 February – Andy Ganteaume, 95, cricketer.
2 March – Marion Patrick Jones, 85, writer.
15 March – Lincoln Myers, 66, politician, Environment and National Service minister and MP for St Ann's East.
23 March – Rangy Nanan, 62, cricketer.
12 May – Mike Agostini, 81, Trinidad and Tobago-born Australian Olympic sprinter (1956), Commonwealth Games gold medalist (1954).
12 June – Harold La Borde, 82, sailor.
2 July – Patrick Manning, 69, politician, Prime Minister (1991–1995, 2001–2010).
8 August – Makandal Daaga, 80, political activist.

References

 
2010s in Trinidad and Tobago
Years of the 21st century in Trinidad and Tobago
Trinidad and Tobago
Trinidad and Tobago
Trinidad and Tobago